Layland may refer to:

 Layland, Ohio, unincorporated community in Ohio, United States
 Layland, West Virginia, unincorporated community in West Virginia, United States
 Francis Layland-Barratt, British Liberal Party politician

See also
 Layland-Barratt baronets, a title in the Baronetage of the United Kingdom
 Layland v Ontario (Minister of Consumer and Commercial Relations)

 Layla (disambiguation)